Mogubai Kurdikar (15 July 1904 – 10 February 2001) was a renowned Indian classical vocalist of the Jaipur-Atrauli gharana.

Early years and background
Mogubai was born in the village of Kurdi in Portuguese-ruled Goa. Little is known of her father; her mother, Jayashreebai, was known locally as a talented singer. In 1913, when Mogubai was ten years old, her mother took her to the temple at Zambaulim and arranged for a wandering holy man to teach music to Mogubai for a while. Later, she took Mogubai to a traveling theatre company, the Chandreshwar Bhootnāth Sangeet Mandali, and the company took Mogubai in as an actress.

While Mogu was with Chandreshwar Bhootnath Mandali (चन्द्रेश्वर भूतनाथ मंडळी), her mother died in 1914. She entrusted little Mogubai to the care of her confident Balkrishna Parvatkar, who also hailed from Kurdi village and worked for the same theatre company. A legend says that on her deathbed, her mother told Mogu that her aatma (soul) will not reincarnate until Mogu became a famous singer. The theatre company soon went bankrupt, and the rival Sātārkar Stree Sangeet Mandali (सातारकर स्त्री संगीत मंडळी) hired Mogu. She played commendably the parts such as of Kinkini in the play, Punyaprabhāv, and of the heroine Subhadrā in the play with the same name, Subhadrā. During her stint at the Sātārkar Stree Sangeet Mandali (सातारकर स्त्री संगीत मंडळी), Mogu was given lessons in music by Chintobuva Gurav. At the same time, Mogu took lessons in Kathak from Ramlal. She was also trained in Ghazal by Dattaramji Nanodkar. A conflict arose, however, between Mogu and one of the senior women in the theatre company, who then expelled Mogu from the company.

Mogu's spirits drooped and it also took a toll on her health. In 1919, Mogu was taken by her aunt for medical treatment to Sangli. The visit to Sangli opened a new chapter in her life. While in Sangli, she learnt music under the tutelage of Inayat Khan for a brief while.

Career

Alladiya Khan and the power struggle in Bombay

At this time, vocalist Alladiya Khan was in Sangli for medical treatment, and on his way to and from his Vaidya Abasaheb Sambare's home, he walked by Mogu's residence, where he would hear her practice. One day, Alladiya Khan, eager to know the identity of the singer who was rehearsing the song, climbed the stairs and entered the room. Mogu was startled to see a stranger and stopped singing. He asked her to continue singing and at the end appreciated her. He offered to teach her and started the first lesson immediately. Young Mogu of course agreed, but despite Alladiya's fame, she had not heard of him – it was not until some time later, when she observed dignitaries bow down to him, that she fully realised his standing. She was stunned and overjoyed to know who her trainer was.

After eighteen months, Alladiya Khan moved to Bombay (or Mumbai), and Mogu followed in 1922. Mogu resided at a small rented premises at Khetwadi in Bombay. Thus begun a time of intrigue in Bombay's high-society and classical music circles.  At that time, Alladiya Khan was the court musician of the princely Kolhapur State but he used to have longer periods of residence in Bombay where he used to train his disciples. Her tutelage under Alladiya was filled with obstacles. Ustad Alladiya's students put forth him a condition that he should not train anyone else except them. For Alladiya was supported in Bombay by wealthy patrons in exchange for music teaching, and they would not let him take other students.

In the early 1920s, Mogu was forced to leave her guru's tutelage.  Mogu was desperate because she could not receive lessons from Alladiya Khan. Upon the advice of her peers, she started learning music from Bashir Khan of the Agra gharana, who agreed to teach her if she would perform the formal gandha-bandan (thread-tying) ceremony of guru-shishya discipleship with fellow Agra musician Vilayat Hussain Khan. The gandha-bandan ceremony was held in 1926 at the Kalidas Building located at Borabhat Lane in Bombay. But after three months, Vilayat Hussain Khan had to leave Bombay because of health problems.

When Alladiya heard of the episode, he demanded that she stop the discipleship and instead go to his younger brother, Hyder Khan. But Mogu hesitated because Ustads of the Agra gharana had much clout. She already had much stress in her personal life. She solicited a promise that Alladiya would teach her himself in the future if his brother Hyder Khan ever failed to do so. Alladiya summoned Hyder Khan from Kolhapur and Mogu's training in the Jaipur-Atrauli Gharana commenced under his tutelage in 1926. However, Alladiya Khan's rich and powerful students were pressing him to end it, since they were greatly jealous of Mogu's progress. In 1931, Alladiya felt forced to persuade his brother to stop teaching and leave town, but came clean to the heartbroken Mogu about what had happened which led to him breaking his promise to her.

At this stage in her career, Mogu could likely have supported herself as a performer but chose not to. Mogu was not interested in only being a performer but wanted to become a leading exponent. On 10 April 1932, Mogu gave birth her child, Kishori. She continued practicing with determination until one day, Alladiya returned to her.

Mogu later received taalim from Ustad Alladiya Khansaheb for a brief period.  In 1939, her husband Madhavdas Bhatia died, leaving Mogu with her three school-age children.

Accomplished singer and guru
Since 1940, Mogubai started touring across India for performances. She also performed at All India Radio. She came forth as a leading exponent of the Jaipur-Atrauli gharana and her riyaz was rigorous. In an attempt to maintain the purity of her music, Mogubai always avoided the thumri and Natya Sangeet.

Kurdikar performed in that era when women singers were not treated with much respect. Her daughter Kishori Amonkar would later recall how Mogubai had to travel to the venue of her performance in third class railway compartments. Despite being a doyenne, Kurdikar was paid less and was subjected to shoddy treatment by many organisers. She was not provided a guest house and had to stay at someone's home.

Mogubai Kurdikar was known as Mai (माई) to her disciples. She passed on her legacy to her disciples including her daughter Kishori Amonkar. Some of her prominent disciples include Amonkar, Kaushalya Manjeshwar, Padma Talwalkar, Kamal Tambe, Vamanrao Deshpande, Babanrao Haldankar, Suhasini Mulgaonkar and Dr. Arun Dravid.

Awards and honours
Mogubai Kurdikar was honoured with several awards, prominent among which are the following:
 Popular title Gaan Tapasvini (गान तपस्वीनी)
 Sangeet Natak Akademi Award (1968)
 Padma Bhushan (1974)

The Gaan Tapasvini Mogubai Kurdikar Award is given at the music festival.

In Kurdikar's home state of Goa, Margao town's Swarmanch institution organised an annual Gaan Tapasvini Mogubai Kurdikar Smruti Sangeet Sammelan in her memory.

Footnotes

Gopalkrishna Bhobe: Kalaatm Gomantak ("Talented Goa")

This was at a time when it was difficult for classical musicians, in however high esteem, to support themselves. The subcontinent's many royal courts had supported the music for centuries, but there was no large middle class and no widespread public appreciation; now the courts were on the remove, and the budding recording industry did not have anything like today's large commercial base.

References

External links 
   Mogubai Kurdikar's discography 
 Mogubai's music page from Vijaya Parrikar Library of Indian Classical Music

1904 births
2001 deaths
Hindustani singers
Recipients of the Padma Bhushan in arts
Indian women classical singers
20th-century Indian singers
Jaipur gharana
Singers from Goa
Women Hindustani musicians
20th-century Indian women singers
People from North Goa district
Women musicians from Goa
20th-century Khyal singers
Recipients of the Sangeet Natak Akademi Award